The Airbus A350 is a long-range, wide-body twin-engine jet airliner developed and produced by Airbus.

The first A350 design proposed by Airbus in 2004, in response to the Boeing 787 Dreamliner, would have been a development of the A330 with composite wings and new engines.
As market support was inadequate, in 2006, Airbus switched to a clean-sheet "XWB" (eXtra Wide Body) design, powered by two Rolls-Royce Trent XWB turbofan engines. The prototype first flew on 14 June 2013 from Toulouse in France. Type certification from the European Aviation Safety Agency (EASA) was obtained in September 2014, followed by certification from the Federal Aviation Administration (FAA) two months later.

The A350 is the first Airbus aircraft largely made of carbon-fiber-reinforced polymers.
It has a new fuselage designed around a nine-abreast economy cross-section, up from the eight-abreast A330/A340. It has a common type rating with the A330.

The airliner has two variants: the A350-900 typically carries 300 to 350 passengers over a 15,000-kilometre (8,100-nautical-mile) range, and has a 283-tonne (617,300-pound) maximum takeoff weight (MTOW); the longer A350-1000 accommodates 350 to 410 passengers and has a maximum range of 16,100 km (8,700 nmi) and a 319 t (703,200 lb) MTOW.

On 15 January 2015, the initial A350-900 entered service with Qatar Airways, followed by the A350-1000 on 24 February 2018 with the same launch customer.

, Singapore Airlines is the largest operator with 61 A350-900 aircraft in its fleet.

A350 orders stood at 925 aircraft, of which 522 had been delivered and all were in service with 40 operators. The global A350 fleet had completed more than 934,000 flights on more than 955 routes without accidents.

It succeeds the A340 and competes against Boeing's large long-haul twinjets: the 787, the 777, and its successor, the 777X.

Development

Background and early designs
Airbus initially rejected Boeing's claim that the Boeing 787 Dreamliner would be a serious threat to the Airbus A330, stating that the 787 was just a reaction to the A330 and that no response was needed. When airlines urged Airbus to provide a competitor, Airbus initially proposed the "A330-200Lite", a derivative of the A330 featuring improved aerodynamics and engines similar to those on the 787. The company planned to announce this version at the 2004 Farnborough Airshow, but did not proceed.

On 16 September 2004, Airbus president and chief executive officer Noël Forgeard confirmed the consideration of a new project during a private meeting with prospective customers. Forgeard did not give a project name, and did not state whether it would be an entirely new design or a modification of an existing product. Airline dissatisfaction with this proposal motivated Airbus to commit €4 billion to a new airliner design.

On 10 December 2004, Airbus' shareholders, EADS and BAE Systems, approved the "authorisation to offer" for the A350, expecting a 2010 service entry.
Airbus then expected to win more than half of the 250-300 seat aircraft market, estimated at 3,100 aircraft overall over 20 years.
Based on the A330, the 245-seat A350-800 was to fly over a 8,600 nmi (15,900 km) range and the 285-seat A350-900 over a 7,500 nmi (13,900 km) range.
Fuel efficiency would improve by over 10% with a mostly carbon fibre reinforced polymer wing and initial General Electric GEnx-72A1 engines, before offering a choice of powerplant.
It had a common fuselage cross-section with the A330 and also a new horizontal stabiliser.

On 13 June 2005 at the Paris Air Show, Middle Eastern carrier Qatar Airways announced that they had placed an order for 60 A350s. In September 2006 the airline signed a memorandum of understanding with General Electric (GE) to launch the GEnx-1A-72 engine for the aircraft. Emirates sought a more improved design and decided against ordering the initial version of the A350.

On 6 October 2005, the programme's industrial launch was announced with an estimated development cost of around €3.5 billion.  The A350 was initially planned to be a 250- to 300-seat twin-engine wide-body aircraft derived from the existing A330's design. Under this plan, the A350 would have modified wings and new engines while sharing the A330's fuselage cross-section. For this design, the fuselage was to consist primarily of aluminium-lithium rather than the carbon-fibre-reinforced polymer (CFRP) fuselage on the Boeing 787. The A350 would see entry in two versions: the A350-800 with a  range with a typical passenger capacity of 253 in a three-class configuration, and the A350-900 with  range and a 300-seat 3-class configuration. The A350 was designed to be a direct competitor to the Boeing 787-9 and 777-200ER.

The original A350 design was publicly criticised by two of Airbus's largest customers, International Lease Finance Corporation (ILFC) and GE Capital Aviation Services (GECAS). On 28 March 2006, ILFC President Steven F. Udvar-Házy urged Airbus to pursue a clean-sheet design or risk losing market share to Boeing and branded Airbus's strategy as "a Band-aid reaction to the 787", a sentiment echoed by GECAS president Henry Hubschman. In April 2006, while reviewing bids for the Boeing 787 and A350, CEO of Singapore Airlines (SIA) Chew Choon Seng, commented that "having gone through the trouble of designing a new wing, tail, cockpit... [Airbus] should have gone the whole hog and designed a new fuselage."

Airbus responded that they were considering A350 improvements to satisfy customer demands. Airbus's then-CEO Gustav Humbert stated, "Our strategy isn't driven by the needs of the next one or two campaigns, but rather by a long-term view of the market and our ability to deliver on our promises." As major airlines such as Qantas and Singapore Airlines selected the 787 over the A350, Humbert tasked an engineering team to produce new alternative designs. One such proposal, known internally as "1d", formed the basis of the A350 redesign.

Redesign and launch

On 14 July 2006, during the Farnborough International Airshow, the redesigned aircraft was designated "A350 XWB" (Xtra-Wide-Body). Within four days, Singapore Airlines agreed to order 20 A350 XWBs with options for another 20 A350 XWBs.

The proposed A350 was a new design, including a wider fuselage cross-section, allowing seating arrangements ranging from an eight-abreast low-density premium economy layout to a ten-abreast high-density seating configuration for a maximum seating capacity of 440–475 depending on variant. The A330 and previous iterations of the A350 would only be able to accommodate a maximum of eight seats per row. The 787 is typically configured for nine seats per row. The 777 accommodates nine or ten seats per row, with more than half of recent 777s being configured in a ten-abreast layout that will come standard on the 777X. The A350 cabin is  wider at the eye level of a seated passenger than the 787's cabin, and  narrower than the Boeing 777's cabin (see the Wide-body aircraft comparison of cabin widths and seating). All A350 passenger models have a range of at least . The redesigned composite fuselage allows for higher cabin pressure and humidity, and lower maintenance costs.

On 1 December 2006, the Airbus board of directors approved the industrial launch of the A350-800, -900, and -1000 variants. The delayed launch decision was a result of delays to the Airbus A380 and discussions on how to fund development. EADS CEO Thomas Enders stated that the A350 programme was not a certainty, citing EADS/Airbus's stretched resources. However, it was decided programme costs are to be borne mainly from cash-flow. First delivery for the A350-900 was scheduled for mid-2013, with the -800 and -1000 following on 12 and 24 months later, respectively. New technical details of the A350 XWB were revealed at a press conference in December 2006. Chief operating officer, John Leahy indicated existing A350 contracts were being re-negotiated due to price increases compared to the original A350s contracted. On 4 January 2007, Pegasus Aviation Finance Company placed the first firm order for the A350 XWB with an order for two aircraft.

The design change imposed a two-year delay into the original timetable and increased development costs from US$5.3 billion (€5.5 billion) to approximately US$10 billion (€9.7 billion). Reuters estimated the A350's total development cost at US$15 billion (€12 billion or £10 billion). The original mid-2013 delivery date of the A350 was changed, as a longer than anticipated development forced Airbus to delay the final assembly and first flight of the aircraft to the third quarter of 2012 and second quarter of 2013 respectively. As a result, the flight test schedule was compressed from the original 15 months to 12 months. A350 programme chief Didier Evrard stressed that delays only affected the A350-900 while the -800 and -1000 schedules remained unchanged.
Airbus' 2019 earnings report indicated the A350 programme had broken even that year.

Design phase

Airbus suggested Boeing's use of composite materials for the 787 fuselage was premature, and that the new A350 XWB was to feature large carbon fibre panels for the main fuselage skin. After facing criticism for maintenance costs, Airbus confirmed in early September 2007 the adoption of composite fuselage frames for the aircraft structure. The composite frames would feature aluminium strips to ensure the electrical continuity of the fuselage, for dissipating lightning strikes. Airbus used a full mock up fuselage to develop the wiring, a different approach from the A380, on which the wiring was all done on computers.

In 2006, Airbus confirmed development of a full bleed air system on the A350, as opposed to the 787's bleedless configuration. Rolls-Royce agreed with Airbus to supply a new variant of the Trent turbofan engine for the A350 XWB, named Trent XWB. In 2010, after low-speed wind tunnel tests, Airbus finalised the static thrust at sea level for all three proposed variants to the  range.

GE stated it would not offer the GP7000 engine on the aircraft, and that previous contracts for the GEnx on the original A350 did not apply to the XWB. Engine Alliance partner Pratt & Whitney seemed to be unaligned with GE on this, having publicly stated that it was looking at an advanced derivative of the GP7000. In April 2007, former Airbus CEO Louis Gallois held direct talks with GE management over developing a GEnx variant for the A350 XWB. In June 2007, John Leahy indicated that the A350 XWB would not feature the GEnx engine, saying that Airbus wanted GE to offer a more efficient version for the airliner. Since then, the largest GE engines operators, which include Emirates, US Airways, Hawaiian Airlines and ILFC have selected the Trent XWB for their A350 orders. In May 2009, GE said that if it were to reach a deal with Airbus to offer the current 787-optimised GEnx for the A350, it would only power the -800 and -900 variants. GE believed it could offer a product that outperforms the Trent 1000 and Trent XWB, but was reluctant to support an aircraft competing directly with its GE90-115B-powered 777 variants.

In January 2008, French-based Thales Group won a US$2.9 billion (€2 billion) 20-year contract to supply avionics and navigation equipment for the A350 XWB, beating Honeywell and Rockwell Collins. US-based Rockwell Collins and Moog Inc. were chosen to supply the horizontal stabiliser actuator and primary flight control actuation, respectively. The flight management system incorporated several new safety features. Regarding cabin ergonomics and entertainment, in 2006 Airbus signed a firm contract with BMW for development of an interior concept for the original A350. On 4 February 2010, Airbus signed a contract with Panasonic Avionics Corporation to deliver in-flight entertainment and communication (IFEC) systems for the Airbus A350 XWB.

Production

In 2008, Airbus planned to start cabin furnishing early in parallel with final assembly to cut production time in half. The A350 XWB production programme sees extensive international collaboration and investments in new facilities: Airbus constructed 10 new factories in Western Europe and the US, with extensions carried out on three further sites.

Among the new buildings was a £570 million (US$760 million or €745 million) composite facility in Broughton, Wales, which would be responsible for the wings. In June 2009, the National Assembly for Wales announced provision of a £28 million grant to provide a training centre, production jobs and money toward the new production centre.

Airbus manufactured the first structural component in December 2009. Production of the first fuselage barrel began in late 2010 at its production plant in Illescas, Spain. Construction of the first A350-900 centre wingbox was set to start in August 2010. The new composite rudder plant in China opened in early 2011. The forward fuselage of the first A350 was delivered to the final assembly plant in Toulouse on 29 December 2011. Final assembly of the first A350 static test model was started on 5 April 2012. Final assembly of the first prototype A350 was completed in December 2012.

In 2018, the unit cost of the A350-900 was US$317.4 million and the A350-1000 was US$366.5 million.
The production rate was expected to rise from three aircraft per month in early 2015 to five at the end of 2015, and would ramp to ten aircraft per month by 2018. In 2015, 17 planes would be delivered and the initial dispatch reliability was 98%. Airbus announced plans to increase its production rate from 10 monthly in 2018 to 13 monthly from 2019 and six A330 are produced monthly. Around 90 deliveries were expected for 2018, with 15% or ≈ units being A350-1000 variants. That year, 93 aircraft were delivered, three more than expected.
In 2019, Airbus delivered 112 A350s (87 A350-900s and 25 A350-1000s) at a rate of 10 per month, and were going to keep the rate around nine to 10 per month, to reflect softer demand for widebodies, as the backlog reached 579 − or  years of production at a constant rate.
The coronavirus crisis caused the decrease of A350 production from 9.5 per month to six per month, since April 2020. After the crises the ramp-up is planed at a rate of 9 per month by the end of 2025.

Testing and certification

The first Trent engine test was made on 14 June 2010. The Trent XWB's flight test programme began use on the A380 development aircraft in early 2011, ahead of engine certification in late 2011. On 2 June 2013, the Trent XWB engines were powered up on the A350 for the first time. Airbus confirmed that the flight test programme would last 12 months and use five test aircraft.

The A350's maiden flight took place on 14 June 2013 from the Toulouse–Blagnac Airport. Airbus's chief test pilot said, "it just seemed really happy in the air...all the things we were testing had no major issues at all." It flew for four hours, reaching Mach 0.8 at 25,000 feet after retracting the landing gear and starting a 2,500 h flight test campaign. Costs for developing the aircraft were estimated at €11 billion (US$15 billion or £9.5 billion) in June 2013.

The A350 received type certification from the European Aviation Safety Agency (EASA) on 30 September 2014. On 15 October 2014, EASA approved the A350-900 for ETOPS 370, allowing it to fly more than six hours on one engine and making it the first airliner to be approved for "ETOPS Beyond 180 minutes" before entry into service. Later that month Airbus received regulatory approval for a Common Type Rating for pilot training between the A350 XWB and A330. On 12 November 2014, the A350 received certification from the FAA. On 1 August 2017, the EASA issued an airworthiness directive mandating operators to power cycle (reset) early A350-900s before 149 hours of continuous power-on time, reissued in July 2019.

Entry into service

In June 2011, the A350-900 was scheduled to enter service in the first half of 2014, with the -800 to enter service in mid-2016, and the -1000 in 2017. In July 2012, Airbus delayed the -900's introduction by three months to the second half of 2014. The delivery to launch customer Qatar Airways took place on 22 December 2014. The first commercial flight was made on 15 January 2015 between Doha and Frankfurt.

The first A350-1000 was assembled in 2016 and had its first flight on 24 November 2016. The aircraft was then delivered on 20 February 2018 to Qatar Airways, which had also been the launch operator of the -900. and entered the commercial service with a flight from Doha to London on 24 February 2018.

Shorter A350-800

The previously planned optimisation to the structure and landing gear was not beneficial enough against better commonality and maximum takeoff weight increase by 11t from 248t. The −800's fuselage is 10 frames shorter (six forward and four aft of wing) than the −900 aircraft. It was designed to supplement the Airbus A330-200 long-range twin. Airbus planned to decrease structural weight in the -800 as development continued, which should have been around airframe 20.

While its backlog reached 182 in mid-2008, it diminished since 2010 as customers switched to the larger -900. After launching the Airbus A330neo at the 2014 Farnborough Airshow, Airbus dropped the A350-800, with its CEO Fabrice Brégier saying "I believe all of our customers will either convert to the A350-900 or the A330neo". He later confirmed at a September 2014 press conference that development of the A350-800 had been "cancelled." There were 16 orders left for the -800 since Yemenia switched to the -900 and Hawaiian Airlines moved to the A330neo in December 2014: eight for Aeroflot and eight for Asiana Airlines, both also having orders for the -900. In January 2017, Aeroflot and Airbus announced the cancellation of its -800 order, leaving Asiana Airlines as the only customer for the variant. After the negotiation between Airbus and Asiana Airlines, Asiana converted orders of eight A350-800s and one A350-1000 to nine A350-900s.

Longer A350-1000
In 2011, Airbus redesigned the A350-1000 with higher weights and a more powerful engine variant to provide more range for trans-Pacific operations. This boosted its appeal to Cathay Pacific and Singapore Airlines, who were committed to purchase 20 Boeing 777-9s, and to United Airlines, which was considering Boeing 777-300ERs to replace its 747-400s. Emirates was disappointed with the changes and cancelled its order for 50 A350-900s and 20 A350-1000s, instead of changing the whole order to the larger variant.

Assembly of the first fuselage major components started in September 2015. In February 2016, final assembly started at the A350 Final Assembly Line in Toulouse. Three flight test aircraft were planned, with entry into service scheduled for mid-2017. The first aircraft completed its body join on 15 April 2016. Its maiden flight took place on 24 November 2016.

The A350-1000 flight test programme planned for 1,600 flight hours; 600 hours on the first aircraft, MSN59, for the flight envelope, systems and powerplant checks; 500 hours on MSN71 for cold and warm campaigns, landing gear checks and high-altitude tests; and 500 hours on MSN65 for route proving and ETOPS assessment, with an interior layout for cabin development and certification. Airbus then completed functional and reliability testing.

Type Certification was awarded by EASA on 21 November 2017, along FAA certification. The first serial unit was on the final assembly line in early December. After its maiden flight on 7 December 2017, delivery to launch customer Qatar Airways slipped to early 2018. The delay was due to issues with the business class seat installation. It was delivered on 20 February 2018 and entered commercial service on Qatar Airways' Doha to London Heathrow route on 24 February 2018.

Possible further stretch
Airbus has explored the possibility of a further stretch offering 45 more seats. A potential 4 m stretch would remain within the exit limit of four door pairs, and a modest MTOW increase from 308 t to 319 t would need only 3% more thrust, within the Rolls-Royce Trent XWB-97 capabilities, and would allow a  range to compete with the 777-9's capabilities.
This variant was to be a replacement for the 747-400, tentatively called the A350-8000, -2000 or -1100.

At the June 2016 Airbus Innovation Days, chief commercial officer John Leahy was concerned about the size of a 400-seat market besides the Boeing 747-8 and the 777-9 and chief executive Fabrice Brégier feared such an aircraft could cannibalise demand for the -1000.
The potential  aeroplane was competing against a hypothetical 777-10X for Singapore Airlines. At the 2017 Paris Air Show, the concept was shelved for lacking market appeal and in January 2018 Fabrice Brégier focused on enhancing the A350-900/1000 to capture potential before 2022/2023, when it will be possible to stretch the A350 with a new engine generation.

Improvements
In October 2017, Airbus was testing extended sharklets, which could offer  extra range and reduce fuel burn by 1.4–1.6%. The wing twist is being changed for the wider, optimised spanload pressure distribution, and will be used for the Singapore Airlines A350-900ULR in 2018 before spreading to other variants.
On 26 June 2018, Iberia was the first to receive the upgraded -900, with a  MTOW version for an  range with 325 passengers in three classes.

By April 2019, Airbus was testing a hybrid laminar flow control (HLFC) on the leading edge of an A350 prototype vertical stabilizer, with passive suction similar to the boundary layer control on the Boeing 787-9 tail, but unlike the natural laminar flow BLADE, within the same EU Clean Sky program.

On 30 September 2022, a  weight reduction and a  MTOW increase was announced, along with a wider interior cabin to offer 30 additional seats.
The interior changes include moving the cockpit wall forward, moving the aft pressure bulkhead one frame further aft and resculpting the sidewalls to allow ten-abreast 17-inch seats.

New Engine Option
By November 2018, Airbus was hiring in Toulouse and Madrid to develop a re-engined A350neo. Although its launch is not guaranteed, it would be delivered in the mid-2020s, after the A321XLR and a stretched A320neo "plus", potentially competing with the Boeing New Midsize Airplane. Service entry would be determined by ultra-high bypass ratio engine developments pursued by Pratt & Whitney, testing its Geared Turbofan upgrade; Safran Aircraft Engines, ground testing a demonstrator from 2021; and Rolls-Royce, targeting a 2025 Ultrafan service entry. The production target is a monthly rate of 20 A350neos, up from 10.

In November 2019, General Electric was offering an advanced GEnx-1 variant with a bleed air system and improvements from the GE9X, developed for the delayed Boeing 777X, to power a proposed A350neo from the mid-2020s.

Design

Airbus expected 10% lower airframe maintenance compared with the original A350 design and 14% lower empty seat weight than the Boeing 777. Design freeze for the A350-900 was achieved in December 2008.
The airframe is made out of 53% composites: CFRP for the empennage (vertical and horizontal tailplanes), the wing (centre and outer box; including covers, stringers, and spars), and fuselage (keel beam, rear fuselage, skin, and frame); 19% aluminium and aluminium–lithium alloy for ribs, floor beams, and gear bays; 14% titanium for landing gears, pylons, and attachments; 6% steel; and 8% miscellaneous. The A350's competitor, the Boeing 787, is 50% composites, 20% aluminium, 15% titanium, 10% steel, and 5% other.

Fuselage

The A350 features a new composite fuselage with a constant width from door 1 to door 4, unlike previous Airbus aircraft, to provide maximum usable volume. Airbus states that the seat will be  wider than a 787 seat in the equivalent configuration.

The current 777 and future derivatives have  greater seat width than the A350 in a nine-abreast configuration. Overall, the A350 gives passengers more headroom, larger overhead storage space, and wider panoramic windows than current Airbus models.

The A350 nose section has a configuration derived from the A380 with a forward-mounted nosegear bay and a six-panel flightdeck windscreen. This differs substantially from the four-window arrangement in the original design. The new nose, made of aluminium, improves aerodynamics and enables overhead crew rest areas to be installed further forward and eliminate any encroachment in the passenger cabin. The new windscreen has been revised to improve vision by reducing the width of the centre post. The upper shell radius of the nose section has been increased.

Wing

The A350 features new composite wings with a wingspan that is common to the proposed variants. Its  wingspan stays within the same ICAO Aerodrome Reference Code E 65m limit as the A330/A340 and the Boeing 777.  The A350's wing has a 31.9° sweep angle for a Mach 0.85 cruise speed and has a maximum operating speed of Mach 0.89.

The -900 wing covers a  area. This is between the  wing of the current Boeing 777-200LR/300ER and the  wing of the in-development Boeing 777X. However, Boeing and Airbus do not use the same measurement. The A350-1000 wing is  larger through a  extension to the inboard sections of the fixed trailing edge.

A new trailing-edge high-lift device has been adopted with an advanced dropped-hinge flap similar to that of the A380, which permits the gap between the trailing edge and the flap to be closed with the spoiler. It is a limited morphing wing with adaptive features for continuously optimising the wing loading to reduce fuel burn: variable camber for longitudinal load control where inboard & outboard flaps deflect together and differential flaps setting for lateral load control where inboard & outboard flaps deflect differentially.

The manufacturer has extensively used computational fluid dynamics and also carried out more than 4,000 hours of low- and high-speed windtunnel testing to refine the aerodynamic design. The final configuration of wing and winglet was achieved for the "Maturity Gate 5" on 17 December 2008. The wingtip device curves upwards over the final . The wings are produced in the new £400 million (US$M),  North Factory at Airbus Broughton, employing 650 workers, in a specialist facility constructed with £29M of support from the Welsh Government.

Undercarriage
Airbus adopted a new philosophy for the attachment of the A350's main undercarriage as part of the switch to a composite wing structure. Each main undercarriage leg is attached to the rear wing spar forward and to a gear beam aft, which itself is attached to the wing and the fuselage. To help reduce the loads further into the wing, a double side-stay configuration has been adopted. This solution resembles the design of the Vickers VC10.

Airbus devised a three-pronged main undercarriage design philosophy encompassing both four- and six-wheel bogies to stay within pavement loading limits. The higher weight variant, the A350-1000 uses a six-wheel bogie, with a  undercarriage bay. French-based Messier-Dowty provides the main undercarriage for the -900 variant, with titanium forgings from Kobelco, and UTC Aerospace Systems supplies the −1000 variant. The nose gear is supplied by Liebherr Aerospace.

Systems

Honeywell supplies its  HGT1700 auxiliary power unit with 10% greater power density than the TPE331 from which it is developed, and the air management system: the bleed air, environmental control, cabin pressure control and supplemental cooling systems. Airbus says that the new design provides a better cabin atmosphere with 20% humidity, a typical cabin altitude at or below  and an airflow management system that adapts cabin airflow to passenger load with draught-free air circulation.

The ram air turbine, capable of generating 100 kilovolt-ampere, is supplied by Hamilton Sundstrand and located in the lower surface of the fuselage. In light of the 787 Dreamliner battery problems, in February 2013 Airbus decided to revert from lithium-ion to the proven nickel-cadmium technology although the flight test programme will continue with the lithium-ion battery systems. In late 2015, A350 XWB msn. 24 was delivered with  lighter Saft Li-ion batteries and in June 2017, fifty A350s were flying with them and benefiting from a two-year maintenance schedule instead of NiCd's 4–6 months.

Parker Hannifin supplies the complete fuel package: inerting system, fuel measurement and management systems, mechanical equipment and fuel pumps. The fuel tank inerting system features air-separation modules to generate nitrogen-enriched air to reduce the flammability of fuel vapour in the tanks. Parker also provides hydraulic power generation and distribution system: reservoirs, manifolds, accumulators, thermal control, isolation, software and new engine- and electric motor-driven pump designs. Parker estimates the contracts will generate more than US$2 billion in revenues over the life of the programme.

Cockpit and avionics

The revised design of the A350 XWB's glass cockpit dropped the A380-sized display and adopted  liquid-crystal display screens. The new six-screen configuration includes two central displays mounted one above the other (the lower one above the thrust levers) and a single (for each pilot) primary flight/navigation display, with an adjacent on-board information system screen. Airbus says the cockpit design allows for future advances in navigation technology to be placed on the displays plus gives flexibility and capacity to upload new software and to combine data from multiple sources and sensors for flight management and aircraft systems control. An optional head-up display is also present in the cockpit.

Avionics are a further development of the integrated modular avionics (IMA) concept found on the A380. The A350's IMA will manage up to 40 functions (versus 23 functions for the A380) such as undercarriage, fuel, pneumatics, cabin environmental systems, and fire detection. Airbus stated that the benefits includes reduced maintenance and lower weight because as the IMA replaces multiple processors and LRUs with around 50% fewer standard computer modules known as line-replaceable modules. The IMA runs on a 100 Mbit/s network based on the AFDX standard, as employed in the A380, in place of the architecture used on the A330/A340.

Propulsion

In 2005, GE was the launch engine of the original A350, aiming for 2010 deliveries, while Rolls-Royce offered its Trent 1700.
For the updated A350 XWB, GE offered a  GEnx-3A87 for the A350-800/900, but not a higher thrust version needed for the A350-1000, which competes with the longer range 777 powered exclusively with the GE90-115B.
In December 2006, Rolls-Royce was selected for the A350 XWB launch engine.

The Rolls-Royce Trent XWB features a  diameter fan and the design is based on the advanced developments of the Airbus A380 Trent 900 and the Boeing 787 Trent 1000. The higher-thrust version will have some modifications to the fan module—it will be the same diameter but will run slightly faster and have a new fan blade design—and run at increased temperatures allowed by new materials technologies from Rolls-Royce's research.

The Trent XWB may also benefit from the next-generation reduced acoustic mode scattering engine duct system (RAMSES), an acoustic quieting engine nacelle intake, and a carry-on design of the Airbus's "zero splice" intake liner developed for the A380. A "hot and high" rating option for Middle Eastern customers Qatar Airways, Emirates, and Etihad Airways keep its thrust available at higher temperatures and altitudes.

Airbus aimed to certify the A350 with 350-minute ETOPS capability on entry into service. That could reach 420 min later, although Airbus achieved a 370–minute ETOPS rating on 15 October 2014 which covers 99.7% of the Earth's surface. Engine thrust-reversers and nacelles are supplied by US-based UTC Aerospace Systems.

Operational history
 

One year after introduction, the A350 fleet had accumulated 3,000 flight cycles and around 16,000 block hours. Average daily usage by first customers was 11.4 hours with flights averaging 5.2 hours, which are under the aircraft's capabilities and reflect both short flights within the schedules of Qatar Airways and Vietnam Airlines, as well as flight-crew proficiency training that is typical of early use and is accomplished on short-haul flights. Finnair was operating the A350 at very high rates: 15 flight hours per day for Beijing, 18 hours for Shanghai, and more than 20 hours for Bangkok. This may have accelerated the retirement of the Airbus A340.

In service, problems occurred in three areas. The onboard maintenance, repair, overhaul network needed software improvements. Airbus issued service bulletins regarding onboard equipment and removed galley inserts (coffee makers, toaster ovens) because of leaks. Airbus had to address spurious overheating warnings in the bleed air system by retrofitting an original connector with a gold-plated connector. Airbus targeted a 98.5% dependability by the end of 2016 and to match the mature A330 reliability by early 2019.

By the end of May 2016, the A350 fleet had flown 55,200 hours over 9,400 cycles at a 97.8% operational reliability on three months. The average flight was 6.8 hours, with the longest average being 9.6 hours by TAM Airlines and the shortest being 2.1 hours by Cathay Pacific's. It is to seat from 253 seats for Singapore Airlines to 348 seats for TAM Airlines, with a 30 to 46 seat business class and a 211 to 318 seat economy class, often including a premium economy. A total of 49 A350s were delivered to customers in 2016. It was also planned that the monthly rate would grow to 10 by the end of 2018, which was eventually achieved in 2019 when Airbus delivered 112 aircraft over a period of 11 months.

In January 2017, two years after introduction, 62 aircraft were in service with 10 airlines. They had accumulated 25,000 flights over 154,000 hours with an average daily utilisation of 12.5 hours, and transported six million passengers with a 98.7% operational reliability. Zodiac Aerospace encountered production difficulties with business class seats in their Texas and California factories. After a year, Cathay Pacific experienced cosmetic quality issues and upgraded or replaced the seats for the earliest cabins.
In 2017, average test flights before delivery decreased to 4.1 from 12 in 2014, with an average delay down to 25 days from 68. Its reliability was 97.2% in 2015, 98.3% in 2016, and 98.8% in June 2017, just behind its 99% target for 2017.

In June 2017 after 30 months in commercial operation, 80 A350s were in service with 12 operators, the largest being Qatar Airways with 17 and 13 each at Cathay Pacific and Singapore Airlines (SIA). LATAM Airlines had the longest average sector at 10.7 hours, and Asiana had the shortest at 3.8 hours. Singapore Airlines operated the longest leg, Singapore to San Francisco , and the shortest leg, Singapore to Kuala Lumpur . Seating varied from 253 for Singapore Airlines to 389 for Air Caraïbes, with most between 280 and 320.

On 30 September 2022, the 500th A350, an A350-900, was delivered to Iberia.
, the global A350 fleet had 3.36 years average aircraft age, had completed more than 934,000 flights on more than 955 routes, and had carried more than 241 million passengers since its entry into service; the fleet had 99.4 percent operational reliability in the last 3 months.

Qatar Airways paint dispute 
In August 2021, as several A350s were sent in to be repainted for the 2022 World Cup in Qatar, Qatar Airways discovered that their paint was unusually degraded. The airline grounded its airliners until the root cause could be determined, and would not accept deliveries until the problem could be solved. The European regulator, EASA, found that paint degradation did not affect the aircraft structure nor introduces "other risks". Singapore Airlines had not detected such problems with its fleet.

In November 2021, Reuters found that Finnair, Cathay Pacific, Etihad, Lufthansa and Air France had also complained of paint damage as early as 2016. On 20 December 2021, Airbus received a formal legal claim in the English courts filed by Qatar Airways. Qatar Airways alleged that the surface flaws cause the risk of fuel tank ignition due to the degradation in lightning protection over the fuel tanks in the wings. The court hearing was originally scheduled for summer 2023. Both Airbus and Qatar Airways agreed to settle the dispute on 1 February 2023.

The Qatar civil aviation regulator was the only one agreeing with the airline.
Qatar Airways was claiming a $200,000-per-day compensation for each grounded aircraft.
Airbus decided to cancel Qatar’s outstanding orders, showing that it was certain of its case.
While the settlement is confidential, Airbus may benefit more as there is no major impact to Airbus’s finances, the A350 reputation remains intact and Qatar’s A321neos will be delivered three years late, underlining their price was not renegotiated.

Variants

The three main variants of the A350 were launched in 2006, with entry into service planned for 2013. At the 2011 Paris Air Show, Airbus postponed the entry into service of the A350-1000 by two years to mid-2017. In July 2012, the A350's entry into service was delayed to the second half of 2014, before the -900 began service on 15 January 2015. In October 2012, the -800 was due to enter service in mid-2016, but its development was cancelled in September 2014. The A350 is also offered as the ACJ350 corporate jet by Airbus Corporate Jets (ACJ), offering a  range for 25 passengers for the -900 derivative.

A350-900

Airbus says that per seat, the Boeing 777-200ER should have a 16% heavier manufacturer's empty weight, a 30% higher block fuel consumption, and 25% higher cash operating costs than the A350-900. The −900 is designed to compete with the Boeing 777 and 787 (777-200ER/LR, and Boeing 787-10), while replacing the Airbus A340-300 and A340-500.

A proposed A350−900R extended-range variant was to feature the higher engine thrust, strengthened structure, and landing gear of the  MTOW -1000 to give a further  range.

Philippine Airlines (PAL) will replace its A340-300 with an A350-900HGW ("high-gross weight") variant available from 2017. It will enable non-stop Manila-New York City flights without payload limitations in either direction, a  flight. This will enable an  range with 325 seats in a three-class layout.

After Emirates' Tim Clark was shown a ten-abreast economy cabin and galley changes, he said the -900 is "more marketable" as a result.

The average lease rates of the first A350-900s produced in 2014 were $1.1 million per month, not including maintenance reserves amounting to $18 million after 10–12 years, and falling to $940,000 per month in 2018 while a new A350-900 is leased for $1.2 million per month and its interior can cost $12 million, 10% of the aircraft.
By 2018, a 2014 build was valued $108M falling to $74.5M by 2022 while a new build was valued for $148M, a 6+12year check cost $3M and an engine overhaul $4–6.5M.

A350-900ULR

Non-stop flights could last more than 20 hours. The first −900ULR was rolled out without its engines in February 2018 for ground testing. Flight-tests after engine installation checked the larger fuel capacity and measured the performance improvements from the extended winglets. It made its first flight on 23 April 2018.

Singapore Airlines, the launch customer and currently the only operator, used its seven -900ULR aircraft on non-stop flights between Singapore and New York City and cities on the U.S. west coast. Singapore Airlines' seating is to range from 170 in largely business class seating up to over 250 in mixed seating. The planes can be reconfigured. They will have two seating classes. The airline received its first -900ULR on 23 September 2018, with 67 business class seats and 94 premium economy seats. On 12 October 2018, it landed the world's then-longest flight at Newark Liberty International Airport from Singapore Changi after 17 hours and 52 minutes, covering  for a  orthodromic distance. As of 2022, the A350-900ULR is used on the longest flight in the world, Singapore Airlines Flights 23 and 24 from Singapore to New York JFK.

At the 2015 Dubai Air Show, John Leahy noted the demand of the Middle Eastern Gulf airlines for this variant. In February 2018, Qatar Airways stated its preference for the larger -1000, having no need for the extra range of the -900ULR. Compared to the standard -900, the -900ULR additional value is likely around $2 million.

ACJ350
Airbus Corporate Jet version of the A350, the ACJ350, is derived from the A350-900ULR. The German Air Force is to be the first to receive the ACJ350 having ordered 3 aircraft which will replace its 2 A340-300.

A350 Regional
The A350 Regional was expected to be ordered by Etihad Airways and Singapore Airlines. Since 2013, there has been no further announcement about this variant.

Singapore Airlines selected an A350-900 version for medium-haul use, and Japan Airlines took delivery of a 369-seat A350-900 with a  MTOW for its domestic flight network. The A350 Type Certificate Data Sheet includes MTOWs of 217, 235, 240, 250, 255, 260, 268, 272, 275, 277, 278, 280 and 283 t.

A350-1000

The A350-1000 is the largest variant of the A350 family at just under  in length. With a 9-abreast configuration, it is designed to replace the A340-600 and compete with the Boeing 777-300ER and 777-9. Airbus estimates a 366-seat -1000 should have a  lighter operating empty weight than a 398-seat 777-9, a 15% lower trip cost, a 7% lower seat cost, and a  greater range. Compared to a Boeing 777-300ER with 360 seats, Airbus claims a 25% fuel burn per seat advantage for an A350-1000 with 369 seats. The  extension seats 40 more passengers with 40% more premium area.
The -1000 can match the 40 more seats of the 777-9 by going 10-abreast but with diminished comfort.

The A350-1000 has an 11-frame stretch over the −900 and a slightly larger wing than the −800/900 models with trailing-edge extension increasing its area by 4%. The main landing gear is a 6-wheel bogie instead of a 4-wheel bogie, put in a one frame longer bay. These and other engineering upgrades are necessary so that the −1000 model maintains range.

The avionics software adaptation is activated by a push and pull button to avoid mistakes and could be retrofitted in the smaller -900. All performance targets have been met or exceeded, and it remains within its weight specification, unlike early −900s.

Its basic  MTOW was increased to  before offering a possible  version. Its 316 t MTOW appeared on 29 May 2018 update of its type certificate data sheet. Initial speculation suggested that the variant might be marketed as the A350-1000ULR. However, the -1000 is not expected to share the -900ULR's larger fuel tanks and other fuel system modifications, and Airbus has stopped short of describing the largest MTOW variant as a ULR model, despite the  range.

In November 2019, maximum accommodation increased to 480 seats from 440 through the installation of new "Type-A+" exits, with a dual-lane evacuation slide.
On 17 December 2021, French Bee took delivery of the first A350-1000 in this 480-seat configuration, leased by Air Lease Corporation and to be operated by from Paris to Reunion Island, with 40 premium and 440 economy seats.

In December 2019, Qantas tentatively chose the A350-1000 to operate their Project Sunrise routes, before a final decision in March 2020 for up to 12 aircraft.
After a delay due to the COVID-19 pandemic, the decision was confirmed on 2 May 2022, when Qantas placed a formal order for 12 Airbus A350-1000 aircraft for Project Sunrise flights to start in 2025. The aircraft will be configured with 238 seats in four classes.

A350F

An A350-900 freighter was first mentioned in 2007, offering a similar capacity to the MD-11F with a range of 9,250 km (5,000 nmi), to be developed after the passenger version. In early 2020, Airbus was proposing an A350F before a potential launch. The proposed freighter would be slightly longer than the A350-900 and Airbus would need 50 orders to launch the $2–3 billion programme. 
In July 2021, the Airbus board approved the freighter development. It is based on the -1000 version for a payload over 90 tonnes, and entry into service is targeted for 2025.

At the November 2021 Dubai Air Show, US lessor Air Lease Corporation became the launch customer with an order for seven to be delivered around 2026, among other Airbus airliners. The launch operator of the A350F will be Singapore Airlines, who ordered 7 aircraft at the 2022 Singapore Airshow, and deliveries will start from 2025.
The 70.8 m (232 ft) long cargo variant should have a  range at max payload.

Operators

As of February 2018, 142 -900s had been delivered, with a dispatch reliability of 99.3%.
At the November 2019 Dubai Air Show, Emirates finalised an order for fifty -900s for $16 Billion at list prices, to be delivered from 2023 to 2028.
The order replaced the February agreement for thirty A350s and forty A330Neos, compensating the cancellation for thirty-nine A380s, causing the end of the double-decker production.
By the end of November 2019, 33 operators had received 331 aircraft from 959 orders, and 2.6 million hours have been flown. 

There were 522 A350 aircraft in service with 40 operators and 54 customers . The five largest operators were Singapore Airlines (61), Qatar Airways (53), Cathay Pacific (46), Delta Air Lines (28) and Air China (23).

Orders and deliveries

Accidents and incidents

The global A350 fleet has zero fatalities and no hull loss accidents as of February 2023.

Specifications

Aircraft model designations

ICAO aircraft type designators

See also

Notes

References

External links

 
 
 

 
A350
2010s international airliners
Articles which contain graphical timelines
Twinjets
Low-wing aircraft
Aircraft first flown in 2013
Wide-body aircraft